Cryptantha crymophila is a perennial plant in the Borage Family (Boraginaceae). It is commonly called subalpine cryptantha.

Habitat and range
It is found in the Alpine and Tuolumne Counties, south of Lake Tahoe, in the Sierra Nevada range of California. It is generally found in rocky volcanic soil or scree.

Description
C. crymophila has many stems with prickly leaves. The nutlets have winged margins.

References

crymophila
Flora of the Sierra Nevada (United States)